Avançon is the name of several communes in France:

 Avançon, Hautes-Alpes, in the Hautes-Alpes department
 Avançon, Ardennes, in the Ardennes department